The 2015 MTV Movie Awards were held on April 12, 2015, at the Nokia Theatre in Los Angeles, California. This was the 24th installment of the award show and the second time the Nokia Theatre would serve as its venue. The award show was hosted by comedian, writer, and actress Amy Schumer. The announcement was made on Wednesday, December 10, 2014.

On February 25, 2015, the announcement for the new MTV Movie Awards logo created by the Australian husband and wife artists duo Dabs Myla. The artists also announced they were working on the set design for the award show. Kelly Osbourne, Josh Horowitz, Christina Garibaldi and British singer Jessie J hosted the pre-show.

Performers
 Fall Out Boy & Fetty Wap - "Centuries"/"Trap Queen"
 Charli XCX, Ty Dolla Sign & Tinashe - "Famous"/"Drop That Kitty"

Presenters
Vin Diesel - presented Best Female Performance
Channing Tatum, Joe Manganiello, Matt Bomer, and Adam Rodriguez - Presented Scared-As-Sh**t Performance
Bella Thorne - presented reminder to vote for Movie of the Year
Miles Teller - presented the Trailblazer Award
Mark Wahlberg and Jessie J - presented Best Comedic Performance
Zac Efron and Emily Ratajkowski - introduced Fall Out Boy and Fetty Wap
Chris Evans, Scarlett Johansson, Chris Hemsworth, Mark Ruffalo, and Jeremy Renner - presented the MTV Generation Award and an exclusive clip of Avengers: Age of Ultron
Miles Teller, Kate Mara, Michael B. Jordan, and Jamie Bell - presented Best Duo
Anders Holm and Logan Paul - presented the T-Mobile Award for Best Break Up
Reese Witherspoon and Sofía Vergara - presented Best Kiss
Cara Delevingne and Nat Wolff - introduced Charli XCX, Ty Dolla Sign and Tinashe
Brittany Snow, Anna Camp, Hailee Steinfeld and Rebel Wilson - presented exclusive clip to Pitch Perfect 2 and Best Male Performance
Jimmy Kimmel - presented the Comedic Genius Award
Bella Thorne - presented the trailer to Scream
Dwayne Johnson - presented Movie of the Year

Nominations

Films with multiple nominations
The following 16 films received multiple nominations:

Individuals with multiple nominations 

The following 20 acts received multiple nominations:

Multiple wins

Films with multiple wins 
 Three - Neighbors, The Fault in Our Stars and The Maze Runner
 Two - The Hunger Games: Mockingjay – Part 1

Individuals with multiple wins 

 Three - Dylan O'Brien (The Maze Runner) and Shailene Woodley (The Fault in Our Stars)
 Two - Zac Efron (Neighbors)

Awards
The winners are in bold.

The nominees were announced on the morning of March 4, 2015.

MTV Trailblazer Award
 Shailene Woodley

Comedic Genius Award
 Kevin Hart

MTV Generation Award
 Robert Downey Jr.

References

External links
 MTV Movie Awards official site

MTV Movie & TV Awards
MTV Movie Awards
MTV Movie Awards
21st century in Los Angeles